Grand Avignon (full name Communauté d'agglomération du Grand Avignon) is the communauté d'agglomération, an intercommunal structure, centred on the city of Avignon. It is located in the Vaucluse and the Gard departments, in the Provence-Alpes-Côte d'Azur and Occitanie regions, southern France. It was created in December 2000. Its area is 302.6 km2. Its population was 197,102 in 2022, of which 91,729 in Avignon proper.

Composition
The communauté d'agglomération consists of the following 16 communes (of which 7 in the Gard department):

Les Angles
Avignon
Caumont-sur-Durance
Entraigues-sur-la-Sorgue
Jonquerettes
Morières-lès-Avignon
Le Pontet
Pujaut
Rochefort-du-Gard
Roquemaure
Saint-Saturnin-lès-Avignon
Sauveterre
Saze
Vedène
Velleron
Villeneuve-lès-Avignon

References

Avignon
Avignon
Avignon
Avignon